Akhtem Shevketovich Seitablayev (born 11 December 1972) is a Ukrainian actor, screenwriter and film director of the Crimean Tatars orign. He is the director of several high-profile films, including Haytarma in 2013 and Another's Prayer in 2017. He has expressed opposition to the annexation of Crimea by the Russian Federation and his films about the fate of several prominent Crimean Tatars have been praised throughout the former Soviet Union but criticized by hardline Russian nationalists.

Early life 
Seitablaiev was born in 1972 in Yangiyo‘l, then part of the Uzbek SSR. During the Stalinist period, his parents were deported by the Soviet authorities to Uzbekistan in the Sürgün since Crimean Tatars were one of the several ethnic groups to experience universal exile in the Stalin era. He attended school in Uzbekistan and remained in there with his family until they moved back to Crimea during the Perestroika era in 1989, where he began his film career in 1992 after graduating from the Crimean Cultural Enlightenment School.

Career 
From 1992 to 2004 he worked at the Simferopol State Crimean Tatar Theater, where he directed several plays including works of Alexander Pushkin. In 2005 he began working at the Kyiv Academic Theatre of Drama and Comedy on the left-bank of Dnieper. In 2009 he directed his first film, Quartet for Two. In 2013 he directed the movie Haytarma (English: Return) based on the real life of Amet-khan Sultan, a Crimean Tatar flying ace and twice Hero of the Soviet Union who witnessed the Sürgün but managed to avoid deportation due to his father's Lak ancestry and the intervention of Timofey Khryukin, commander of the 8th Air Army. The film was praised by the Kyiv Post as "must-see for history enthusiasts" and criticized by Komsomolskaya Pravda for depicting the NKVD officers doing the deportation as violent while portraying the deported women and children in a much more sympathetic light.

Russian consul in Crimea Vladimir Andreev said the film was "distorting the truth", and attacked the movie for being made by Crimean Tatars, who he said deserved to be deported, but he admitted that he did not actually watch the film, and based his opinion that the movie was inaccurate only because it was made by Crimean Tatars. However, Andreev's orders telling Russians invited to the film to not attend resulted in several Russian generals invited to the premiere cancelling, though some still saw it. Andreev's comments sparked a huge backlash that led to his resignation, while Seitablayev jokingly thanked Andreev for giving the movie free advertising.

In 2015, Seitablayev's family and film were featured in an Unreported World documentary about the Russian annexation of Crimea.

From 2016 to 2017 he directed Another's Prayer, based on the real life of Saide Arifova, a kindergarten director who saved over 80 Jewish children during the Holocaust by switching their ethnicity listing and teaching them to imitate Crimean Tatar customs and language to hide them from the Gestapo. Eventually the Nazis suspected she was involved in hiding Jewish children and tortured her, but she refused to betray any names. After the Red Army retook control of Crimea she saved them again by explaining to the NKVD that the children were Jewish, not Crimean Tatar, and hence were allowed to stay in Crimea instead of being deported to the desert. The film debuted on 18 May 2017, the anniversary of the Sürgün. Originally the film was supposed to be filmed in Crimea, but after the annexation of Crimea by the Russian Federation in 2014 it was decided that the filming would be done in mainland Ukraine and Georgia.

Personal life 
On 29 May 2018, he released a statement in support of Oleg Sentsov, a film director arrested in Russian-controlled Crimea. He is married to actress Ivanna Diadiura, and has three children. His eldest daughter Nazly is an actress, dancer, and model who also had a role in Haytarma.

Awards 

 Order "For Merits" III class - for significant personal contribution to state building, socio-economic, scientific and technical, cultural and educational development of Ukraine, significant labor achievements and high professionalism (August 24, 2017)
 Laureate of the State Prize of Crimea - for the role of Macbeth in the play "McDuff" ("McDuff" - the name of Shakespeare's play "Macbeth" in the Crimean Tatar version).
 Winner of the Kyiv Pectoral Theater Award for the role of Romeo in the play Romeo and Juliet.
 Nariman Aliyev's Ukrainian film "Home" was recognized as the best foreign film 7th International Bosphorus Film Festival, and Akhtem Seitablayev, who starred in the film, received the award for best male role.
 Winner of the Vasyl Stus Prize 2020.

Filmography

Actor

Director

References 

1972 births
Living people
People from Yangiyo‘l
1+1 (TV channel) people
21st-century Ukrainian male actors
Ukrainian theatre directors
Ukrainian film directors
Crimean Tatar actors
Recipients of the Vasyl Stus Prize